Prasino is a village and a community in the municipal unit of Iardanos, Elis, Greece. It is 2 km northwest of Agios Georgios, 3 km southeast of Vounargo and 5 km northwest of Pyrgos town centre. The community consists of the villages Prasino, Glykorizo and Keramidia. Its elevation is 70 m.

Population

See also

List of settlements in Elis

References

Iardanos
Populated places in Elis